The Lithuania Governorate was a short-lived governorate (guberniya) of the Russian Empire in 1796–1801.

After the third partition of the Polish–Lithuanian Commonwealth in 1795, the former territories of the Grand Duchy of Lithuania were divided between the Vilna Governorate and the Slonim Governorate by Catherine II of Russia. After her death just a year later, her son Paul I of Russia became the Emperor of Russia. He reversed or modified many of his mother's policies and decisions, including administrative divisions. On December 12, 1796, the two governorates were merged into one called the Litva Governorate with capital in Vilna. In 1801, Paul I was assassinated and the Litva Governorate was divided into the Litva-Vilna Governorate and the Litva-Grodno Governorate by his successor, Alexander I of Russia.

References

 
1801 disestablishments
Governorates of the Russian Empire
States and territories established in 1796
1796 establishments in the Russian Empire